Tom Woolgar is a British chess boxer and event organiser who established Great Britain Chess Boxing Organisation and the London Chessboxing Club the first United Kingdom chessboxing institution. He is a former holder of the title, British Heavyweight Chess Boxing Champion. He also promotes chess boxing events.

He plans to come out of retirement to fight in London in December 2022 if he can make it up into the ring. ChessboxingNation.com will be covering all the lead up to the event.  Tom “The Hippo” Woolgar has historically directed a number of these past shows.

London Chessboxing promotes regular chessboxing events in the United Kingdom. Early events were held at Bethnal Green Working Men's Institute, subsequent events have been staged at the larger capacity Boston Dome in North London and SCALA, Central London.

On 10 September 2011 London Chessboxing staged its first event at the SCALA in King's Cross, central London.  Two subsequent events have been staged at this venue on 16 March 2012 ("TwoTribes") and 29 September 2012 ("PrizeFightKnight").  During the Summer Olympics of 2012 planned a planned two-day chessboxing tournament at the London Pleasure Gardens had to be cancelled due to crowd-control and infrastructure problems at the host site.  On 10 October 2012 London Chessboxing staged a sell-out event ("Battle Royale") in the Royal Albert Hall loading bay. This unusual subterranean arena was opened to the public for the occasion for the first and only time since the Royal Albert Hall was completed in 1871.

Woolgar, otherwise known as “the Hippo” because of his rotund midsection  has fought 12 times in Chessboxing with a record of 4-7-1. 

The Chessboxing Organisation is registered as a charity in England and Wales (reg no.1131672) and is dedicated to bringing free chessboxing coaching to young people in London. The Organisation provides subsidised chess and boxing coaching to youth residents of Islington, North London.

Biography
Woolgar formerly worked in the media as one of the UK's first video-journalists being one of the original recruits to Associated Media's TV news service Channel One London. Woolgar also worked as a video-journalist at the BBC's Science and Features department, an executive producer at ITV and as head of interactive programming at Endemol UK.

On 15 August 2008, Woolgar won 1st vacant title of British heavyweight championship by checkmate in 9th round against Exeter-based Stewart Telford.

On 24 April 2009, Woolgar had the world's first chess boxing match under amateur rules against Matthew Read, losing to a 7th round checkmate.

In October 2011, Woolgar was elected to the post of director of marketing of the English Chess Federation with 95 votes cast in his favour, 89 votes cast in favour of 'none of the above' and six abstentions. He served his entire term, but did not stand for re-election in 2012.

Record

|-  style="background:#CCFFCC;"
| 2010-10-16 || Win ||align=left| Hubert "The Wardrobe" van Melick || "Beyond The Super-Dome"  || Boston Dome, London, England || Check-mate || 9 ||
|-
|-  style="background:#CCFFCCC;"
| 2010-05-15 || Win ||align=left| Nick Cornish || "Super-Dome 2" || Boston Dome, London, England || Check-mate || 7 ||
|-  style="background:#FFBBBB;"
| 2010-03-15 || Loss ||align=left| Sergio Leveque || "Super-Dome"  || Boston Dome, London, England || Check-mate || 5 ||
|-
|-  style="background:#CCFFCC;"
| 2009-10-09 || Win ||align=left| Matthew "Crazy Arms" Read || "Game of Kings"  || Bethnal Green, London, England || Time Penalty  || 7 ||
|-
|-  style="background:#CCFFCC;"
| 2009-08-15 || Win ||align=left| Stewart Telford || "An Exhibition of CHESSBOXING" || Bethnal Green, London, England || Check-mate || 9 ||
|-
! style=background:white colspan=9 |
|-
|-
| colspan=9 | Legend:    

|-  style="background:#FFBBBB;"
| 2009-04-24 || Loss ||align=left| Matthew "Crazy Arms" Read ||  || London, England || Time Penalty || 7 ||
|-
|-
| colspan=9 | Legend:

References

External links
 London Chessboxing Club website
 ECF Board Officials

Living people
Year of birth missing (living people)
British chess players
Chess boxers
British male boxers